January 2014

See also

References

 01
January 2014 events in the United States